Initiative is assumption of control of a culturally defined interaction by conducting the initial moves, forcing the other players into respondent roles.

Initiative may also refer to:

Fiction 
 Avengers: The Initiative, a comic book series from Marvel Comics
 Civil War: The Initiative, a comics crossover storyline from Marvel Comics
 Fifty State Initiative, a fictional government program in the Marvel Comics Universe
 The Dharma Initiative, a fictional organization from the television show Lost
 "The Initiative", the seventh episode of season 4 of the television show Buffy the Vampire Slayer

Games 
 Initiative (chess), the ability in chess to make attacks that must be responded to
 initiative (role-playing games), a number which determines the order in which characters take actions, especially during combat

Organizations 
 Initiative, a media buying agency that is part of Interpublic Group of Companies (IPG)
 The Initiative Collective (aka "The Initiative"), a worldwide group of grassroots neighborhood watch organizations
 Initiative of Communist and Workers' Parties (INITIATIVE), a European Marxist–Leninist political group

Political science 
 Initiative is a political process by which a referendum can be triggered by a petition of voters

Other 
 Initiative Q, an alternative payment network
 The Initiative (Tunisia) – a political party
 The Hawkeye Initiative, a tumblr page that features comic book character Hawkeye in various poses held by female comic book characters